Varodaya Cinkaiariyan (died 1325) was the first of the Aryacakravarti kings of Jaffna Kingdom to take over the lucrative pearl fisheries that were in the hands of the Pandyan Empire. He is also credited as having helped the Pandyas in their last few years and invaded the southern Dambadeniya-based kingdoms. He increasingly took part in the burgeoning Indian Ocean-based commerce.

Notes

References

1325 deaths
Kings of Jaffna
Sri Lankan Tamil royalty
Year of birth unknown